Erythrochrus is a genus of moths in the family Hyblaeidae described by Gottlieb August Wilhelm Herrich-Schäffer in 1855.

Species
 Erythrochrus bicolor
 Erythrochrus hyblaeiodes
 Erythrochrus notabilis

References

Hyblaeidae
Moth genera